Skotbu is a village in Ski municipality, south of the town of Ski, in Akershus County, Norway.

References

Villages in Akershus